The Boxwood Plantation Slave Quarter (also known as The Little Brick) is a historic building near Trinity, in Lawrence County, Alabama.  The plantation was founded in late 1810s by Samuel Elliot, an Ulsterman who had originally settled in Middle Tennessee.  Elliott and his son, Samuel Jr., built Boxwood into one of the largest plantations in the county, with $36,000 in real property and 92 slaves by 1860.  Both the main plantation house and the slave quarters were built in the mid-1850s.  Although the main house was demolished in the 1950s to make way for the widening of Highway 20, the slave quarter was remodeled and continued to serve as a house.  The surrounding area continued to operate as a farm until 2010, when the land was purchased to construct an industrial park.  The quarter is being preserved, and the later alterations have been removed, revealing the building's original form.

Unlike most contemporary plantations, Boxwood and its major dependencies were constructed of brick.  The slave quarters are the only remnant of the several cotton plantations in northwest Morgan and northeast Lawrence counties, and one of only eight brick plantation quarters in Alabama.  The double-pen building has two doors on the façade leading to separate rooms.  Two windows on the rear of the house were converted to doors in the 1960s.  A gable roof has chimneys in each end.  The building was listed on the National Register of Historic Places in 2013.

References

National Register of Historic Places in Lawrence County, Alabama
Residential buildings completed in 1854
History of slavery in Alabama
Slave cabins and quarters in the United States